Shevchenkove is a selo in Brovary Raion, Kyiv Oblast, Ukraine, at about  northeast by east from the centre of Kyiv city. It belongs to Velyka Dymerka settlement hromada, one of the hromadas of Ukraine.

References

Villages in Brovary Raion